Chris Samojlenko, better known as Anabolic Frolic and Chris Frolic, is a happy hardcore DJ from Canada who is known for the Happy 2b Hardcore CD series and the Hullabaloo! promotion he threw in Toronto, Ontario.

Biography
Samojlenko was born in Ottawa, Ontario, Canada in 1974 and was raised by his grandmother. He first started being interested in Happy Hardcore upon listening to a randomly chosen UK import mixed tape at the now defunct rave shop X-static in 1995.  He taught himself to DJ on a pair of used turntables bought from a pawnshop for $100. It was the only way he could listen to the music he loved in Toronto (or anywhere in North America then), mainly because he didn't go to raves at the time.  Frolic began importing and re-selling Happy Hardcore vinyl from the UK.

At age 21, Samojlenko became interested in it as a lifestyle.  He started Nokturnal Records out of his bedroom, importing and selling vinyl records online.  In 1996, he moved into a small, windowless office, sleeping on the floor for the next two years while trying to make a go of his DJ career and his events production company, Hullabaloo!.

He was signed by Steve Levy, a co-owner of the international music label Moonshine Records, after sending them an unsolicited mixed tape and, according to his own website, a faked magazine article he had a friend write for him.

The first Happy 2b Hardcore release in 1997 sold 100,000 copies.  Chris also met Robin Grainer that year—a fan from Southern California who would become his wife.

In 2000, Samojlenko was banned from ever entering the United States due to visa violations, but this ban was lifted after a period of three years.  To add to his legal problems, his American fiancée at the time also did not have status in Canada.  Despite these professional and personal uncertainties, however, Samojlenko put out Happy2bHardcore Chapters Four and Five, producing two of the latter's tracks and continuing to organise his Hullabaloo events.

Currently, there are eight Happy 2b Hardcore albums by Anabolic Frolic released, and he co-hosted an online radio show called HappyHourRadio with his "DJ crony" Silver1.  HappyHourRadio ceased late 2004/early 2005 and the last Hullabaloo! event was held on July 14, 2007 (One More Group Hug).

In 2019, Samojlenko held a non-musical reunion event under the Hullabaloo banner (One Last Group Hug) to mark the release of his memoir Requiem For My Rave, chronicling his personal story through the rave culture of Toronto.

Discography
The Frolic Files - Happy Hardcore Level 1 (August, 1996)
Happy 2b Hardcore Chapter 1 (January 21, 1997)
Live @ Not The End 2 (April, 1997)
Live @ Hullabaloo! 1: Something Good (June 21, 1997)
Happy 2b Hardcore Chapter 2 (September 9, 1997)
Live @ Hullabaloo! 2: Return of the Vibe (September 10, 1997)
Live @ Hullabaloo! 3: Love & Magic (November 22, 1997)
Live @ Hullabaloo! 4: Into the Blue (February 7, 1998)
Live @ Hullabaloo! 5: Meltdown (April 24, 1998)
Live @ Hullabaloo! 6: Birthday Funtopia (June 27, 1998)
Live @ Hullabaloo! WEMF Stage 98 (July 18–20, 1998)
Live @ Destiny/Next Junction (October 3, 1998)
Live @ Hullabaloo! 7: Electric Dreams (October 10, 1998)
Live @ Hullabaloo! 8: Rush Hour (December 8, 1998)
Live @ Hullabaloo! 9: Big Top (February 6, 1999)
Live @ Hullabaloo! 10: Foreverland (April 17, 1999)
Happy 2b Hardcore Chapter 3 (April 20, 1999)
Live @ Hullabaloo! 11: Birthday Funtopia 2 (June 19, 1999)
Live @ Hullabaloo! WEMF Stage 99 (July 19–20, 1999)
Live @ Hullabaloo! 12: View to a Thrill (October 9, 1999)
Live @ Hullabaloo! 13: For Those Who Know (UK Vs Canada) (December 4, 1999)
Live @ Hullabaloo! 14: Ooh Crikey... Wot a Scorcher! (February 5, 2000)
Happy 2b Hardcore Chapter 4 (February 22, 2000)
Live @ Hullabaloo! 15: Through the Looking Glass (Cancelled - Replaced with "Group Hug") (April 15, 2000)
Live @ World Electronic Music Festival 2000 (July 15, 2000)
Live @ Hullabaloo! WEMF Stage 2000 (August 2–4, 2000)
Live @ Hullabaloo! 16: Birthday Funtopia 3 (October 7, 2000)
Live @ Hullabaloo! 17: Space Invader (December 9, 2000)
Happy 2b Hardcore Chapter 5 (January 23, 2001)
Live @ Hullabaloo! 18: Rhythm of Life (February 3, 2001)
Live @ Hullabaloo! 19: Group Hug 2001 (April 20, 2001)
Live @ Hullabaloo! WEMF Stage 2001 (August 2–4, 2001)
Live @ Hullabaloo! 20: The Hullabaloo! iDance Pre-Party (September 1, 2001)
Happy 2b Hardcore Chapter 6: The Final Chapter (November 6, 2001)
Live @ Hullabaloo! 21: Turn Up The Music (November 10, 2001)
Live @ Hullabaloo! 22: Make Believe (February 16, 2002)
Live @ Hullabaloo! 23: Field of Dreams (May 11, 2002)
Live @ Hullabaloo! 24: The Anthems (July 5, 2002)
Live @ Hullabaloo! WEMF Stage 2002 (July 19–20, 2002)
Live @ Hullabaloo! 25: Warp Factor (September 28, 2002)
Live @ Hullabaloo! 26: Digital Outlaws (December 14, 2002)
Happy 2b Hardcore Chapter 7: A New Beginning (January 21, 2003)
Live @ Hullabaloo! 27: Power Of Dreams (February 8, 2003)
Live @ Hullabaloo! 28: Get Hype (April 19, 2003)
Live @ Hullabaloo! 29: Stay Here Forever (July 5, 2003)
Live @ Hullabaloo! 30: Fires in the Sky (September 20, 2003)
Live @ Hullabaloo! 31: Enchanted (December 6, 2003)
Live @ Hullabaloo! 32: Accelerator (February 7, 2004)
Live @ Hullabaloo! 33: Sail Away (April 17, 2004)
Live @ Hullabaloo! 34: Birthday Funtopia 7 (July 3, 2004)
Live @ Hullabaloo! 35: Drift on a Dream (September 18, 2004)
Live @ Hullabaloo! 36: Back & Forth (December 11, 2004)
Live @ Hullabaloo! 37: Pacific Sun (February 5, 2005)
Live @ Hullabaloo! 36: Lost in Space (April 30, 2005)
Live @ The Hullabaloo! Pre-Party Extravaganza (July 8, 2005)
Live @ Hullabaloo! 37: All Good Things (July 9, 2005)
Happy 2b Hardcore Chapter 8: The Lost Mix (March 5, 2007)
Live @ Hullabaloo! 38: One More Group Hug (July 14, 2007)

Happy2bHardcore discography

Chapter 1
This was the start to the series of albums released by Anabolic Frolic, and was released on January 21, 1997.

Track list
Reach Out - Eruption
Higher Love - JDS
Go Insane - DJ DNA
Feel The Power - DJ Codeine & Unknown
It's Not Over - Seduction & Dougal
Forever - Bananaman
Here I Am - DJ Demo, DJ Ham, Justin Time
Surrender - Eruption
Here We Go Again - DJ Ham
I Believe - DJ Stompy
Heart Of Gold - Force & Styles
Muzik - DJ Demo
Dawn of a New Era - DJ Stompy
Let The Music - Eruption
Now is the Time - Scott Brown Vs Dj Rab S
Wanting To Get High - Hixxy

Chapter 2
The second chapter in the series was released on September 9, 1997.

Track list
Crowd Control [Vinylygroover remix] - Ramos, Supreme
Killer - Demo
Eternity - Jimmy J, Jenka, Justin Time
Time - Vinylgroover
You're Mine - DJ Demo
Cloudy Daze - Bang!
12" Of Love [97 remix]
I Feel You - DJ Fade, Martina
Natural High [Anabolic Frolic's H2BH] - Unknown
Kick Your Legs
See The Light - Brisk, Lenny, Trixxy
Big Up The Bass - Blaze
Sweet In The Pocket '97 - Justin Time, Blaze
Get into Love - Anti-Social
People's Party [remix] - Hixxy, Sunset Regime
Keep On Trying

Chapter 3
The third chapter in the series was released on April 20, 1999.
Track list
Distant Skies - Unique
Break Of Dawn [Brisk & Ham mix] - Bang!
Eurolove - Brisk, Trixxy
Wonderful World [Brisk remix] - Triple J
Sunrize - Trixxy
Don't Go Away - Visa
Shooting Star [Ham mix] - Bang!
Innovate - Innovate
Sensation - Sy, Demo
Till We Meet Again - DJ Slam
You Belong To Me - Eternity, King Size
Tears Run Cold - Sy, Demo
Pleasure And Pain [Justin Time remix] - Ad-Man, Demo
Eye Opener - Brisk, Trixxy
Let Me Play - DJ Hyperactive

Chapter 4
The fourth chapter in the series was released on February 22, 2000.

Track list
Space Odyssey - Vinylgroover & Trixxy
Everytime I Close My Eyes - Scott Brown, Gillian Tenant
Better Day [Sy & Unknown remix] - GBT Inc.
Hear Me - Mr. X
All That You See & Hear - Elevate
John Gotti's Revenge - Vinygroover & Trixxy
Raver's Anthem - MC Storm, Sy & Unknown
Run To Me [Brisk remix] - Elogic
Elysium - Scott Brown
Love Of My Life [Brisk remix] - Northern Lights
I Want You - Lisa Abbott, BDB
Mirror Of Love - Ina
Clearly Now [Brisk remix] - Frisky & Daniella
Give Me A Reason - Bang!
See Me Climb [Brisk remix] - Stealth

Chapter 5
The fifth chapter of the series was released on January 23, 2001

Track list
Music I Like - Fabulous Faber
Blue Moon - DJ Kaos, Ethos
Excitement - Fabulous Faber
Feels So Right - Anabolic Frolic
Lost Generation - Scott Brown
Sail Away [Trixxy mix]
Sunshine - Force & Styles
Stay With Me - DJ Demo, The Sy Project
Pilgrim 2000 - Scott Brown
Shelter Me - Anabolic Frolic
2000 Style - Robbie Long & Coyote
Take It From The Groove [DNA and Breeze mix]
Oblivion [Ham mix]
Space Invader [Scott Brown remix] - Euphony
Power Of Love - Q-Tex

Chapter 6: The Final Chapter
The sixth and "final" chapter was released on November 6, 2001.

Track list
Drift On A Dream - Ethos
All I Need [Kaos remix]- Visa
Turn Up The Music - Scott Brown
Deep Inside - DJ UFO
Jump A Little Higher - Breeze & MC Storm
Euphoric State - DNA
Toy Town [remix] - Hixxy & Sharkey
Roll The Track - Interstate
Look At Me Now - Force & Styles
Influence - DJ Slam & Helix
Flyin High - DJ UFO & Stu J
About U - DNA & Ham
Can't Stop - [Brisk remix] - Midas
Come Together - Hixxy
Make Believe - Force & Styles

Chapter 7: A New Beginning
The 7th chapter of the series, is the revival of the initial series, was released on January 21, 2003.

Track list
Intro- MC Jumper @ Hullabaloo
Don't Cry For Me - Dougal & Innovate
Like An Angel - Q-tex
Follow Me[Breeze and Styles remix]- Force & Styles
Fly With You - DJ Fade
Power Of Dreams - DJ Impact
Create - DJ Ufo
I'm Ready - Hixxy
Shine a Light - Nimrod
Definition of a Badboy - Hardcore Authority
My Way[Hixxy remix] - Antisocial
Lost - Kaos & Ethos
Till The Day [Blizzard remix] - Blaze!
Get Hype - Dougal & Gammer
You're Shining - Breeze & Styles
Just Accept It - Hixxy Ft. MC Storm

Chapter 8: The Lost Mix
The 8th chapter of the series, was given to all the attendees of the Hullabaloo! event "One More Group Hug" on July 14, 2007.

Track list
Break of Dawn (Scott Brown remix) - Force & Jack Speed feat. Lisa Abbott
Through the Darkness (Dougal & Gammar remix) - Mickey Skeedale feat. Jenna
Lifts Me Up - DJ Flyin & Limitz
Ordinary People - Dougal & Gammer
24/7 (Breeze & Styles remix) - Eclipse
Shadow of a Memory - Arkitech
Heaven's Above (Hixxy remix) - Adam Harris
Fires in the Sky - Dougal & Gammer
Pay Attention - DJ Ham
Neckbreaker (Essential Platinum remix) - Scott Brown
You're My Angel - Breeze & Styles
Make the Beat Drop - Scott Brown
True Awareness - Vagabond feat. MC Casper
Stay Here Forever - Brisk & Fade
Heartbeats (Scott Brown remix) - Breeze & Styles
Field of Dreams - Force & Styles

Notes

Sources
Anabolic Frolic's personal webpage
Happy Hardcore Online database (CD track listings)
Anabolic Frolic on MySpace
Article about closure

External links
Hullabaloo!
Hullabaloo! on YouTube

Date of birth missing (living people)
1974 births
Living people
Canadian electronic musicians
Happy hardcore musicians
Musicians from Ottawa